Lockington is a small village and civil parish in the East Riding of Yorkshire, England.

The civil parish is formed by the villages of Lockington and Aike and the hamlet of Thorpe.
According to the 2011 UK census the population of Lockington parish was 524, a decrease on the 2001 UK census figure of 542.
There were 247 separate households. However, since this census, recent housing developments have occurred.

The parish church of St Mary is a Grade I listed building.

The A164 road  and the Yorkshire Coast railway line from Hull to Scarborough both pass through the parish. Until 13 June 1960 Lockington railway station operated on the line. The level crossing adjacent to the station was the scene of a fatal accident on 26 July 1986.

In 1823 Lockington was in the civil parish of Lockington and of Kilnwick, in the Wapentake of Harthill. A National School existed in the village. Population was 491, with occupations including thirteen farmers, two carpenters, two shoemakers, a blacksmith, a tailor, a bricklayer, a corn miller, and the landlord of The Buck public house. Residents included the parish clerk, a schoolmaster, and a gentleman. A carrier operated between the village and Hull and Beverley once a week.

References

External links

Village website

Villages in the East Riding of Yorkshire
Civil parishes in the East Riding of Yorkshire